The following is a list of artists considered to be general purveyors of the psychedelic pop genre.

Psychedelic era

The Avant-Garde
The Beach Boys
The Beatles
Bee Gees (60s work)
Chamaeleon Church
Donovan
Edwards Hand
The Electric Prunes
The End
Tommy James
Kaleidoscope
Marmalade
The Neon Philharmonic
Geoff Nicholls
The Nova Local
Orange Bicycle
Pink Floyd
Plastic Penny
The Rainy Daze
Rotary Connection
Sagittarius
The Savage Rose
The Spike Drivers
Skip Bifferty
Strawberry Alarm Clock
Traffic (early work)
Underground Sunshine
World of Oz
Zager and Evans

Later years

Animal Collective
The Arcana
Baby Lemonade
The Barracudas
The Dream Syndicate
Gorky's Zygotic Mynci
The Growlers
Guards
The Happy Bullets
Jellyfish
The Junipers
Lush
Mercury Rev
Connan Mockasin
Pond
Prince Rama
Quilt
Rain Parade
The Rollo Treadway
Simian
Sticky Fingers
Super Furry Animals
Tame Impala
Temples
The Three O'Clock
True West
Vows
Yura Yura Teikoku

See also
List of psychedelic folk artists
List of psychedelic rock artists

References

Bibliography

Lists of musicians by genre